Consejo Mundial de Lucha Libre (CMLL;  "World Wrestling Council") is a Mexico City-based professional wrestling promotion. It was founded in 1933 and is the oldest active promotion in the world. In the company's long history it has promoted a number of professional wrestling championships as part of their shows, using various divisional, special stipulations, and weight-class championships. Over the years a total of nine CMLL championships have either been abandoned or control of the title was given to another promotion. CMLL actively promotes twelve world championships, seven national championships, and eight regional championships.

Like most lucha libre promotions, CMLL allows their wrestlers to bring championship belts to their shows even if they are not CMLL sanctioned, and have on occasion allowed those championships to be defended on CMLL shows, but they are not considered CMLL championships. As professional wrestling championship is not won or lost by actual sports competition, but by a scripted ending to a match, determined by the bookers and matchmakers. On occasion, the promotion declares a championship vacant, which means there is no title holder at that point in time. This can either be due to a storyline, or real-life issues such as a championship suffering an injury and being unable to defend the title, or leaving the company.

Defunct championships

Mexican National Middleweight Championship (1933–1993)

(Mexico City Boxing and Wrestling Commission). Yaqui Joe was the first champion and the championship was soon defended on EMLL shows as well as on the Mexican independent circuit. Over time EMLL gained almost total control of the championship as they grew to become Mexico's largest promotion at the time. In 1992, Antonio Peña founded Asistencia Asesoría y Administración (AAA), taking a number of CMLL wrestlers with him. One of these wrestlers, was the then-reigning National Middleweight Champion Octagón, who took the championship with him to AAA. Blue Panther winning the championship pn July 27, 1992, signaled that the commission had granted AAA control of the championship and taken it away from CMLL. Afterward, CMLL created the CMLL World Middleweight Championship as the main focus of the division.

NWA World Middleweight Championship (1939–2010)

 
In 1939, wrestler Gus Kallio was awarded the "World Middleweight Championship" in Mexico, as recognition of Kallio's middleweight wrestling achievements in the United States. He lost the championship to Octavio Gaona on February 19, 1939, establishing the championship under EMLL's control. In 1953, EMLL joined the National Wrestling Alliance (NWA) and the NWA officially recognized the middleweight championship as an NWA championship, renaming it to the NWA World Middleweight Championship shortly after EMLL joined the NWA. EMLL, and later CMLL promoted the NWA World Middleweight Championship as the highest-ranking middleweight championship, relegating the Mexican National Middleweight Championship to a secondary status. EMLL retained control of the championship and continued to use the NWA moniker after 1986. From 1994 until 2004 the championship was controlled by various Japanese promotions but returned to CMLL in September 2004. In 2010, CMLL relinquished control of the championship to the NWA and introduced the NWA World Historic Middleweight Championship as its replacement.

NWA World Welterweight Championship (1946–2010)

El Santo became the first champion on March 15, 1946, when he defeated Pete Pancof to win the championship. In 1953, EMLL joined the NWA and the NWA officially recognized the welterweight championship as an NWA championship, making it the NWA World Welterweight Championship shortly after EMLL joined the NWA. The company would continue promoting the championship until 1996 when it was brought to Japan to be one of eight titles that made up the New Japan Pro-Wrestling's J-Crown Championship. After the J-Crown was disbanded in late 1997, the championship remained in Japan, used by Toryumon. When Toryumon became Dragon Gate, the NWA World Welterweight Championship was taken over by Osaka Pro Wrestling. On November 27, 2007, La Sombra defeated Hajime Ohara to win the championship, bringing it back under CMLL control. In 2010 CMLL gave up control of the championship to the NWA and introduced the NWA World Historic Welterweight Championship as its replacement.

NWA World Light Heavyweight Championship (1958–2010)

The NWA World Light Heavyweight Championship was created in 1951 for one of the US-based NWA territories, but by 1958 the championship was given to EMLL after joining the NWA. The first Mexican-based champion was Dory Dixon, who defeated Al Kashley on February 13, 1958, to win the vacant championship. Over the subsequent 52 years, EMLL/CMLL had 52 separate reigns, divided between a total of 38 wrestlers. In 2010 CMLL gave up control of the championship to the NWA and introduced the NWA World Historic Light Heavyweight Championship as its replacement.

EMLL Arena México Tag Team Championship (1960s)
Magazines from the late-1960s occasionally refer to an EMLL Arena México Tag Team Championship being defended. It was similar to the CMLL Arena Coliseo Tag Team Championship, in that it was intended to only be defended on Arena México shows. A December 1966 source listed El Santo and Rayo de Jalisco being the champions at that point in time. The champions were mentioned again in the lead up to La Ola Blanca ("The White Wave"; Dr. Wagner and Ángel Blanco) winning the championship on December 2, 1967. On September 27, 1968 it was reported that El Santo and Ray Mendoza defeated La Ola Blanca to win the championship.

NWA Intercontinental Heavyweight Championship (1990)
EMLL briefly promoted the "NWA Intercontinental Heavyweight Championship" in late 1990. Pirata Morgan won the championship no later than October 1990; records are unclear if Morgan won a tournament or was awarded the championship. Pirata Morgan lost the championship to El Faraón on September 13 on a show in Mexico City. The championship was abandoned when El Faraón was fired by EMLL the following month.

CMLL Japan Women's Championship (1999–2001)

The CMLL Japan Women's Championship was unveiled on October 17, 1999 on a show in Osaka, Japan. Chikako Shiratori defeated Lady Apache, in a best-of-five match series to become the inaugural champion. Her initial reign lasted until sometime in November 1999 where La Diabólica won the title on a CMLL Japan show in Tokyo. La Diabólica's reign lasted only a matter of weeks before Shiratori regained the championship on November 25, 1999, in Kyoto, Japan. The CMLL Japan Women's Championship was actively defended in Japan after CMLL stopped touring. Shiratori's last documented championship defense took place on January 7, 2001, where she defeated Policewoman to retain the title. When Shiratori retired in June 2001 the CMLL Japan Women's Championship was also retired.

CMLL Japan Super Lightweight Championship (1999–2000)

Starting in 1999, CMLL began to promote recurring tours of Japan under the brand "CMLL Japan" and introduced three championships to be defended exclusively on CMLL Japan shows. The CMLL Japan Super Lightweight Championship was introduced on February 27, 1999, on a show in Nagoya, Japan. The first champion was Masato Yakushiji, who defeated Rencor Latino in a match for the vacant championship. Over the next two years Virus and Ricky Marvin both won the championship twice. CMLL ended their Japanese tours by the end of 2000, abandoning the Super Lightweight Championship. The company later introduced the CMLL World Super Lightweight Championship, which used the CMLL Japan Super Lightweight Championship belt. When the weight division was adjusted to become the CMLL World Lightweight Championship, the promotion retained the original belt.

CMLL Japan Tag Team Championship (1999–2000)
Along with the CMLL Japan Super Light Heavyweight Championship and the CMLL Japan Women's Championship the promotion also introduced the "CMLL Japan Tag Team Championship", exclusively for male tag teams. CMLL representative El Oriental and Japanese Tsubasa defeated Último Guerrero and Virus to become the first tag team champions. Oriental and Tsubasa had no successful title defenses in the 147 days they were the champions, losing to Masato Yakushiji and Naohiro Hoshikawa on an Osaka Pro show in Aomori, Japan. Yakushiji and Hoshikawa defended the championship twice, both on  Osaka Pro shows, before the championship was abandoned in September 2000.

LLA Azteca Championship (2009–2014)

Starting in 2009, CMLL and the television channel TV Azteca Noreste held a series of shows in Monterrey, Nuevo León under the name Lucha Libre Azteca. CMLL introduced the LLA Azteca Championship as the main attraction of both the shows and TV broadcasts. The first champion was Último Guerrero who won an eight-man tournament on December 19, 2009 to claim the title. Over the following five years there were seven LLA Azteca champions, with Atlantis ending up as the last champion. Atlantis won the championship on May 4, 2014, but did not defend the championship afterward. CMLL stopped promoting the LLA shows on September 27, 2015.

Footnotes

References

Consejo Mundial de Lucha Libre championships